The 2000 Betty Barclay Cup was a women's tennis tournament played on outdoor clay courts at Am Rothenbaum in Hamburg, Germany and was part of the Tier II category of the 2000 WTA Tour. It was the 16th edition of the tournament and was held from 2 May until 7 May 2000. First-seeded Martina Hingis won the singles title and earned $87,000 first-prize money.

Finals

Singles

 Martina Hingis defeated  Arantxa Sánchez Vicario 6–3, 6–3
 It was Hingis' 3rd singles title of the year and the 29th of her career.

Doubles

 Anna Kournikova /  Natasha Zvereva defeated  Nicole Arendt /  Manon Bollegraf 6–7(5–7), 6–2, 6–4

References

External links
 ITF tournament edition details
 Tournament draws

Betty Barclay Cup
WTA Hamburg
2000 in German women's sport
2000 in German tennis